Inayatullah Kashmiri was a prominent Mughal noble of Kashmiri descent in the early 1700s, in the position of the Diwan-i-Tan-o Khalisa.

Inayatullah Khan was the father of Hidayatullah Khan, the Grand Vizier of Bahadur Shah I. In the reign of Farrukhsiyar, Inayatullah was responsible for the re-imposition of Jizyah after the death of Aurangzeb:

"Inayatullah has placed before me a letter form the Sherif of Mecca urging that the collection of jizya is obligatory according to our Holy book. In a matter of faith, I am powerless to interfere."

In 1717 he was appointed the governor of Kashmir. He set fire to the Hindu area of Srinagar and forbade the Pandits from wearing turbans. In 1724 he was re-appointed as governor of Kashmir for a third time.

References

Mughal Empire Sufis
Mughal Empire people